Events in the year 1965 in Brazil.

Incumbents

Federal government
 President: Marshal Castelo Branco 
 Vice President: 	José Maria Alkmin

Governors 
 Acre: vacant
 Alagoas: Luis Cavalcante 
 Amazonas: Artur César Ferreira Reis 
 Bahia: Lomanto Júnior  
 Ceará: Virgilio Távora
 Espírito Santo: Francisco Lacerda de Aguiar 
 Goiás: Carlos de Meira Mattos (until 23 January); Emílio Rodrigues Ribas Jr (from 23 January)
 Guanabara:
 until 11 October: Carlos Lacerda
 11 October–5 December: Raphael de Almeida Magalhães 
 from 5 December: Francisco Negrão de Lima
 Maranhão: Newton de Barros Belo 
 Mato Grosso: Fernando Corrêa da Costa 
 Minas Gerais: José de Magalhães Pinto  
 Pará: Jarbas Passarinho 
 Paraíba: Pedro Gondim 
 Paraná: Nei Braga then Antônio Ferreira Rüppel then Algacir Guimarães 
 Pernambuco: Paulo Pessoa Guerra 
 Piauí: Petrônio Portella
 Rio de Janeiro: Pablo Torres                                                                            
 Rio Grande do Norte: Aluízio Alves 
 Rio Grande do Sul: Ildo Meneghetti 
 Santa Catarina: Celso Ramos 
 São Paulo: Ademar de Barros 
 Sergipe: Celso Carvalho

Vice governors
 Alagoas: Teotônio Brandão Vilela 
 Bahia: Orlando Moscoso 
 Ceará: Joaquim de Figueiredo Correia 
 Espírito Santo: Rubens Rangel 
 Goiás: vacant
 Maranhão: Alfredo Salim Duailibe 
 Mato Grosso: Jose Garcia Nieto 
 Minas Gerais: Clóvis Salgado da Gama 
 Pará: Agostinho de Meneses de Monteiro 
 Paraíba: André Avelino de Paiva Gadelha 
 Paraná:
 until 17 November: Afonso Alves de Camargo Neto 
 17 November-20 November: vacant
 from 20 November: Alípio Ayres de Carvalho 
 Pernambuco: vacant
 Piauí: João Clímaco d'Almeida 
 Rio de Janeiro: Teotônio Araújo
 Rio Grande do Norte: Teodorico Bezerra 
 Santa Catarina: Armindo Marcílio Doutel de Andrade
 São Paulo: Laudo Natel 
 Sergipe: vacant

Events 
 27 March – President Castelo Branco and President of Paraguay Alfredo Stroessner inaugurate the Friendship Bridge over the Paraná river, which connects the two countries.
 31 March – Pico da Neblina, the highest mountain in Brazil, is climbed for the first time.
 26 April – Rede Globo, today the largest television broadcaster in the country, is founded.
 3 October – Direct elections for mayors, governors and senators are held in eleven states.
 27 October – Institutional Act Number Two (AI-2) is issued. All political parties are banned.

Births 
 March 11 – José de Anchieta Júnior, Brazilian politician (d. 2018)

Deaths

References

See also 
1965 in Brazilian football
1965 in Brazilian television

 
1960s in Brazil
Years of the 20th century in Brazil
Brazil
Brazil